Food Network is a Southeast Asian pay television channel that airs both one-time and recurring (episodic) programs about food and cooking from the Food Network's library as well as commissioned programming developed regionally. It was launched on 5 July 2010.

The channel itself is not available in South Korea. But under a special agreement, Food TV (a nationwide pay TV channel) is carrying programmes from Food Network by simulcasting the pan-Asian version and airing the shows recorded from the channel in particular time slots.

Programming
 List of programs schedule broadcast by Food Network Asia

High-definition feed
Food Network Asia HD is a 1080i high definition simulcast of Food Network Asia. It originally aired a different lineup than the SD version, with only HD programs.
Food Network Asia was launched in Singapore on July 5, 2010 on StarHub TV channel 468 in HD.
Food Network Asia also launched in Malaysia from October 1, 2010 on Astro channel 706 in HD.

See also
 List of shows on the Food Network

References

External links
 

Asia
Food Network Asia
Television channels and stations established in 2010

zh:美食頻道 (美國)